SCH-23390 also known as halobenzazepine, is a synthetic compound that acts as a D1 receptor antagonist and has either minimal or negligible effects on the D2 receptor.

In  a 1990 study in rats SCH-23390 offered significant protection from death in dextroamphetamine overdosage, without providing protection from death by methamphetamine overdose. The compound provided significant protection from cocaine overdose in rats only at the lowest dose tested in the measurement series. 
This suggested that D-amphetamine and methamphetamine at high (lethal) doses have different mechanisms of toxicity in rats.

References

D1 antagonists
1-Phenyl-2,3,4,5-tetrahydro-1H-3-benzazepines
Chloroarenes